Arapongas is a municipality within the state of Paraná, South Region, Brazil. It is located in the Metropolitan area of Londrina, Microregion Apucarana and Mesoregion North Central Paranaense, being located at a distance of 386 km from the state capital, Curitiba. It occupies an area of approximately 382 km. In 2020, its population was estimated by the Brazilian Institute of Geography and Statistics in 124,810 inhabitants, the sixteenth-most populous city of Paraná, and second-most populous metropolitan area of Londrina.

History 
Situated in the Northern Paraná region, was born by the company's initiative to Northlands Paraná, pioneered the settlement of the region. As well as the cities founded by the company, had all its development based on a master plan. Its creator and founder was William da Fonseca Brabason Davids, director of Northlands Company of Paraná, which at the time of Arapongas Foundation held the post of Mayor of Londrina. In 1935, the French dealer René Cellot and her daughter Jeanine Cellot bought the first lots of land, intended for urban construction. Thus, on 28 September 1935, Rene Cellot and her daughter settled with a home business in the same place where today is the building of Banco Bradesco S / A (former Brazilian Discount Bank S / A), the av. Spies. In the same year it opened and sold the first lot to the Brazilian agricultural farmer Floriano Freire. Immediately, several other farmers, from different nationalities, have taken up residence in the place and settled down with trading houses.

In the following years were populated the plots intended for colonies formed by Japanese and Slavic immigrants, coming thus in 1937, the Colonies Orleans Hope and already populated, which greatly contributed to the progress and expansion of new equity.

Spies remained part of the municipality of Londrina until 1943, when it was created the municipality of Rolândia, which happened to belong, by the way as judicial district, created by Law No. 199 of 30 December 1943, which It approved the new administrative division of Paraná, to take effect in the 1943–1947 five-year period. Due to lack of transport, the district grew slowly, this problem is further aggravated due to restrictions motivated by World War II. Under these conditions, by the year 1945, the district headquarters had about 600 houses and was served by the then Road São Paulo-Parana Iron, who shortly after was built, to become part of the heritage of Paraná Traffic Network – Santa Catarina. Nevertheless, the people of Arapongas continued to fight bravely for their progress and well-being, getting to be an entity with the name of the Society of Friends of Arapongas to strive for their independence, progress and development. And so, as a result of these efforts, the State Government, by Law No. 2 of 10 October 1947, creating the city of Arapongas dismembering him Rolândia and raising its headquarters to a city.

That time, the city had a total area of 2007 square kilometers and consisted of administrative districts of the municipal seat, Astorga and Sabáudia.

A few days after the publication of Law No. 2 of 10 October 1947, he was sworn in as interim Mayor Joseph Simonetti which remained until the inauguration of the first elected mayor, Julio Junqueira, on November 9, 1947, by a coalition of parties opposition. Possession of Julius Junqueira took place thirty days after the election.

The first mayor faced several political problems and even revoked his mandate, that is delivered through a skillful political maneuvering. On January 16, 1948, was installed the region, created just before, in the category of first indentation, and two years later was elevated directly to the rank of third indentation. The first was Judge Ismael Dorneles de Freitas, and the first public prosecutor was Marcolino Leite de Paula e Silva. On July 22, 1951, was elected Mayor John Cernichiaro, which like its predecessor struggled with serious problems of political order. Yet Arapongas continued to progress. In this period he started the paving of the city's public parks; generates the set of City Hall; opened several roads and created numerous city schools.

Twice we had John Cernichiaro ordered the forfeiture of his mandate, and twice two Presidents of the City Council tried to take over the duties of the Mayor, only not succeeding because of the boldness and bravery of the Mayor who resisted even the strength to maneuver Town Council. Finally, using the higher court, John Cernichiaro had won the case, continue in power until the end of his term. In 1952, the first newspaper in the city of Arapongas District 'was inaugurated by Ennio Prosdocimi. Spies missed the territory of Astorga district, which was dismembered and transformed into autonomous municipality. The measure implemented by the state government had no good effect, so much so that the twenty councilors who sit on the City Council, five resigned his mandate in protest. In 1954, the city suffered another break up, with the creation of Sabáudia municipality, the old district of the territory of the same name. With this loss, the municipality reduced the district area and district headquarters.

Notwithstanding the territorial losses, Arapongas turned out to demonstrate entrepreneurial dynamism above the regional average, been developing an extensive industrial park furniture and gifts, today is an important furniture manufacturing hub for the rest of southern Brazil. This happened after the 1970s, when the sudden collapse of the coffee crop in northern Paraná due to heavy frost forced the region's cities to seek new economic basis. The low-cost furniture industry, especially upholstery, soon proved a path with great potential to expand consumption, which led to a proliferation of companies in a well-designed (and pioneer in the region) industrial park. In this sector, the Arapongas polo eventually rivaling the furniture industry in Curitiba, this more traditional but very based on handmade carpentry and therefore less competitive. This industrialization process is the basis of population and economic growth of the city, which is gradually enhancing their commercial and service sectors, occupying virtually equivalent position to Apucarana in the region.

Geography

Climate 
Subtropical Humid Mesothermal, hot summers with rain falling mostly trend (average temperature above 22 °C), winters with little frequent frosts (average temperature below 18 °C) without defined dry season.

Relief 
 Relief predominantly flat with slight elevations.
 Rivers: Ribeirão Pirapó, Lageado Stream, Stream Tres Bocas, Stream of Tight, Basin dos Bandeirantes.

Demography 
Between 2000 and 2010, the population of Arapongas grew at an annual average rate of 2.00%, while in Brazil was 1.17% in the same period. In this decade, the city's urbanization rate increased from 95.74% to 97.79%. In 2010 lived in the city, 104,150 people.

Between 1991 and 2000, the city's population grew at an annual average rate of 3.16%. At UF, this rate was 1.39%, while in Brazil was 1.63% in the same period. In the decade, the city's urbanization rate increased from 92.98% to 95.74%.

Between 2000 and 2010, the dependency ratio in the city rose from 47.22% to 41.23% and the rate of aging, from 6.16% to 8.09%.
 Economically active population of Arapongas: 57,754 (55.45%) (IBGE – Demographic Census 2010).

Tropic of Capricorn 
The Tropic of Capricorn is a parallel situated south of the equator and her imaginary line crosses the territory of Arapongas, in BR-369, exit to Apucarana. On site there is a composite structure of shoulders and a landmark, where travelers from different parts of Brazil and South America usually stop to register his year here, through photos and videos, or out of curiosity.

Education 
Currently, the city has a total of 25 municipal schools, 14 state schools, 16 children's educational centers, 12 private teaching centers, and five universities.

According to the ENEM 1500, the College Prisma is the county's school better positioned to Note 25.83, and the 758 in the overall standings of Paraná.

First school 
The School Group Caravelas Marquis, former School of Arapongas Group, was founded in 1943, even before the city of Arapongas be created in the government of Mayor Miguel Blasi, of Londrina and the governor of the state Moysés Lupion. It was built thanks to the efforts of the pioneers: Antonio Garcez Novaes, Deodato Antero France and others who organized raising materials, as well as hand-to-work done by villagers.

Special education 
CAE "Service Center and expertise to the Visually Impaired and Hearing". It works within the Caravelas Marquis State College one Expertise Center students with Hearing Impairment and Visual. There they develop projects for inclusion and overcoming limits.

Higher education 
Spies has five schools: one public and four private
 UAB – Open University of Brazil
 Unopar – North Paraná University
 Cesumar – University Center of Maringa
 Unipar – University Paranaense.
 Rhema School Education – Rhema Group Education.

Transport

Road

Airway 
Alberto Bertelli Airport, known as Arapongas Airport (IATA: APX – ICAO: SSOG) is a Public Airport administered by the city of Arapongas, with up to 200 takeoffs and landings per month.

The airport is located 5 km northwest from downtown Arapongas. There are currently no scheduled flights operating in this airport airlines.

Fleet 
In 2015 Arapongas fleet is the first state's largest tenth with 76,262 vehicles (October 2015 position).

Culture

Theatres 
The most important theaters are:
 Cine Teatro Maua;
 Teatro Vianinha;
 Teatro Hideo Mihara – Colégio Marquês de Caravelas;

Cinemas 
The most important are:
 Cine Mauá
 Cine Gracher (a 3D room and two rooms in digital format Stadium) –  Havan Arapongas;

Museums 
The Museum of Art and History of Arapongas (MAHRA), located in a historic building, which housed from 1955 to 2010, the municipal administration, the Mahra tells the story of Arapongas through photos and documents that are part of a rich historical collection that is now accessible to the population. The museum will also be venue for major exhibitions by local artists and guests from other regions.

Sports 
The Municipal Stadium José Luis Chiapin is a football stadium with a capacity of 10,440 people. Known as Stadium of birds due to the huge flow of birds in the city, and the city itself have the Bird City nickname, is the home of Arapongas Esporte Clube and Grêmio Sports Araponguense, underwent a refurbishment in April 2009 to Arapongas games in the Access Division of the Paranaense Football Championship.

The city of Arapongas has two clubs in the Campeonato Paranaense, the Arapongas Esporte Clube and Grêmio Araponguense. In the past there were others too, like Arapongas Football Club and the Athletic Association Arapongas.

Tourism

Parque dos Pássaros 
The Parque dos Pássaros was created in 2000 by the city of Arapongas. When created, several schools have helped with their students to plant trees and to leave our park as it is today and bringing more a place for leisure Arapongas

The name was given by a child in a municipal contest schools, integrated to decide the park's name, in which various names were mentioned and Bird Park was chosen.

There we find a variety of entertainment such as: Walking inside the park; Football field inside the park; Skate park, bike, etc.; Fishing (when released for public employees).

In 2014, was made major reforms in the park, from paintings, exchange picket fences, lighting, species management, fruit tree planting, maintenance of flora and fauna, cleaning malls, among others.

Praça Mauá 
Dr. Julio Square Junqueira was the first to be built in Arapongas, was named after Dr. Julio Junqueira named after the first mayor of Arapongas.

Located in the city center, the square is popularly called Praça Mauá. It also contains a children's playground.

Expoara 
The Arapongas Exhibition Pavilion – Expoara – is the largest complex in southern Brazil in area for large trade shows and events. Headquartered in the city of Arapongas (northern Parana) – the second-largest furniture hub in Brazil – and the BR 369 which is the main highway to the south, the Expoara is in the Mercosur route, covering a radius of 100 km – between the cities of Londrina and Maringa – a population of 2 million.

Built in 1997, the pavilion was built to accomplish great fair for the furniture sector as Movelpar – Fair of the State of Paraná Furniture – event that is among the three largest trade fairs in the country, and the FIQ International Fair of Quality in Machines, Raw Materials and Accessories for the Furniture Industry, biannual events that attract exhibitors and visitors from the furniture sector nationwide.

Designed on a flat area, Expoara can be divided into various sizes, meeting the need for different formats of events. The pavilion has 44 000 m2, designed on a plot of 150 000 m2, as well as complete infrastructure for events – electricity, hydro, sewer and telephone in all stands – offers a food court with restaurants for 600 people, sound system, equipped auditorium for 300 seats and 5,000 parking spaces.

Economy 
Its economy is one of the fastest growing in the state, due mainly in agriculture and furniture sector, as the city is the second-largest center of these activities in the country.

Spies attracted new businesses and companies in other industries for their economy, several companies took interest in the city, an example is the Havan, the store is located in BR 369, s / n, received investment of R $35 million and generated 200 jobs direct in the city and region; Location was done in a cinema with a 3D room and two rooms in digital format Stadium by the company Cine Gracher. The city received two fast-food franchise Subway network; Havan one inside the store and another in the center. Madero Container settled attached Arapongas the Havan and all invested R $1.5 million in the unit that serves 5,000 people per month.

Arapongas had a strong economy in 2007, growing by 10.3%, while Brazil has grown at an average of 5%, this colossal development comes mainly from agriculture and its polo furniture which is the second-largest in Brazil the forecast is that Arapongas reaches the level that today is its neighbor city Apucarana in 2015 and Londrina in 2028, its rapid growth makes it one of the fastest-growing cities in the state.

Notable people 
Luciano Pagliarini – Brazilian cyclist.
Ademar Aparecido Xavier Júnior – Brazilian footballer.
Wilson Aparecido Xavier Júnior – Brazilian footballer.

References

External links 
Arapongas's official site

 
Populated places established in 1947
1947 establishments in Brazil